Limosa, 'muddy' in Latin, may refer to:
Limosa, a bird genus
Limosa (magazine), magazine from Sovon, the Dutch Centre for Field Ornithology
Sapo Limosa, or Limosa harlequin frog (Atelopus limosus), an endangered toad species endemic to Panama

See also